Phoma is a genus of common coelomycetous soil fungi. It contains many plant pathogenic species.

Description 
Spores are colorless and unicellular. The pycnidia are black and depressed in the tissues of the host. Phoma is arbitrarily limited to those species in which the spores are less than 15 µm as the larger spored forms have been placed in the genus Macrophoma. The most important species include Phoma beta which is the cause of the heart rot and blight of beets, Phoma batata that produces a dry rot of sweet potato, and  Phoma solani.

Taxonomy 
About 140 Phoma taxa have been defined and recognized which may be divided into two large groups: (i) plurivorous fungi, generally saprobic or weakly parasitic, mainly from temperate regions in Eurasia, but occasionally also found in other parts of the world (including areas with cool or warm climates); and (ii) specific pathogens of cultivated plants. However other estimates place the number of taxa closer to 3000, making it one of the largest fungal genera.

Traditionally nine sections (Phoma, Heterospora, Macrospora, Paraphoma, Peyronellaea, Phyllostictoides, Pilosa, Plenodomus and Sclerophomella) as described by Boerema (1997) have been recognised on morphological grounds. The number of taxa in each section varied widely, from 2 (Pilosa) to 70 (Phoma). Section Phoma itself was considered incertae sedis.

However phylogenetic studies suggest the genus is highly polyphyletic containing six distinct clades.  Furthermore, taxa identified as Phoma have been identified across several different families within Pleosporales, but most within Didymellaceae (type genus Didymella). Furthermore, the Didymellaceae segregate into 18 clusters allowing many taxa to be distributed into separate genera.

Consequently, there is little justification for retaining the sections, a number of which such as Peyronellaea are now elevated to genus rank, within Didymellaceae.

Selected species
Species include:
Phoma candelariellae  – lichenicolous on Candelariella aurella
 Phoma caricae-papayae
 Phoma costaricensis
 Phoma cucurbitacearum
 Phoma destructiva
 Phoma draconis
 Phoma eupyrena
 Phoma exigua
 Phoma exigua var. exigua
 Phoma exigua var. foveata
 Phoma exigua var. linicola
 Phoma glomerata
 Phoma glycinicola
 Phoma herbarum
 Phoma insidiosa
 Phoma microspora
 Phoma narcissi
 Phoma nebulosa
 Phoma oncidii-sphacelati
 Phoma scabra
 Phoma sclerotioides
 Phoma strasseri
 Phoma tracheiphila

References

Bibliography 
 Boerema, G. H.; de Gruyter, J.; Noordeloos, M. E.; Hamers, M. E. C.  2004. Phoma Identification Manual: Differentiation of Specific and Infra-specific Taxa in Culture. CABI.

 
Dothideomycetes genera
Fungal plant pathogens and diseases
Lichenicolous fungi
Taxa described in 1880
Taxa named by Pier Andrea Saccardo